Fabio Pasini (born 23 August 1980) is an Italian cross-country skier who has competed since 2000. He finished 24th in the individual sprint event at the 2010 Winter Olympics in Vancouver. He is born in Gazzaniga.

Pasini's best finish at the FIS Nordic World Ski Championships was 17th in the individual sprint event at Liberec in 2009. His best World Cup finish was second in a team sprint event at Whistler Olympic Park on 18 January 2009. In 2010, he placed third in the free style sprint event of the Italian men's championships of cross-country skiing.

His is the younger brother of cross-country skier Renato Pasini.

Cross-country skiing results
All results are sourced from the International Ski Federation (FIS).

Olympic Games

World Championships

World Cup

Season standings

Individual podiums

1 podium – (1 )

Team podiums

 3 podiums – (3 )

References

External links

1980 births
Living people
Cross-country skiers at the 2010 Winter Olympics
Cross-country skiers at the 2014 Winter Olympics
Italian male cross-country skiers
Olympic cross-country skiers of Italy
Sportspeople from the Province of Bergamo
Cross-country skiers of Gruppo Sportivo Esercito
People from Gazzaniga